The 1894 Centenary Gentlemen football team was an American football team that represented the Centenary College of Louisiana as an independent during the 1894 college football season. In their first year while located at the Jackson, Louisiana campus, the team compiled an 0–1 record.

Schedule

References

Centenary
Centenary Gentlemen football seasons
College football winless seasons
Centenary Gentlemen football